Sweet Vengeance is the debut full-length studio album by the Greek/Swedish melodic death metal band Nightrage. It was released by Century Media Records on 30 June 2003. Some song titles are shortened versions of ones used for demo versions of their respective songs.

Critical reception

Writing for AllMusic, John Serba said the album was "consistently excellent in both song and performance" and "any fan of the melodic European death metal scene should foam at the mouth upon hearing Nightrage's debut."

Blabbermouth was more critical of the album, calling it an "above average slab of melodic crunch that can at different points be both skilful and disparate."

Laura Taylor for Exclaim! stated that "the band pulls off the stylistic experimentation admirably well" and that it "isn't the straightforward melodic death metal album that the first few tracks might lead you to expect."

Track listing

Japanese releases feature a bonus track, an extended demo version of "Gloomy Daydreams".

Personnel

Band members
 Tomas Lindberg − vocals
 Marios Iliopoulos − guitars
 Gus G − guitars
 Brice Leclercq − bass

Guests
Per Möller Jensen − drums (tracks 1-10) & arrangements
Fredrik Nordström − keyboards
Tom S. Englund − clean vocals (tracks 3, 8-10)

References

External links
 Nightrage Discography

Nightrage albums
Century Media Records albums
2003 debut albums
Albums produced by Fredrik Nordström